is a Japanese footballer who plays either as an winger, or as an wing-back for Shonan Bellmare. He has currently being often called-up to feature in matches and training camps with the Japan's under-23s.

Career statistics

Club

References

External links

2002 births
Living people
Association football people from Tokyo
Japanese footballers
Japan youth international footballers
Association football defenders
J1 League players
Shonan Bellmare players